This list presents female speakers of national and territorial upper houses of their respective countries or territories. The upper house, often called the Senate, is the one of two chambers in a bicameral legislature. The upper house usually has less power than the lower house. In some countries, its members are appointed rather than elected by popular votes. Speaker of the upper house is the one who takes office as acting head of state in presidential republic.

National

Italics denotes acting speaker and states that are either de facto (with limited to no international recognition) or defunct.

Territorial

See also
List of current presidents of legislatures
Bicameralism
List of legislatures by country
Parliament
Speaker (politics)
Upper house

Speakers, Upper house
Speakers, Upper house
Speakers, Upper house
Female